Xilinnayi Gao (Uyghur: شىرىن اي گائو Shirinay Gaw; born July 31, 1998), professionally known by her stage name Curley G or  Curley Gao, is a Chinese singer-songwriter. She first gained attention in 2017 on the Chinese singing competition show Sing! China. In 2020, she participated in the survival show Produce Camp 2020, finishing first and debuting as the center of the girl group BonBon Girls 303. She was elected as the leader of BonBon Girls 303. On July, 2022 she released her first EP to remarks the beginning of her solo career.

Early life

Curley Gao was born on July 31, 1998, in Beijing, China. She is the only daughter of a Han Chinese father from Beijing and a Uighur mother from Xinjiang; her surname Gao is a common Han Chinese surname, while her parents decided to give her an Uighur first name, Shirinay, which is transcribed in Pinyin as "Xilinnayi".

She was raised in Beijing until the age of 9 and later moved to Singapore with her parents. In Singapore, she attended Macpherson Primary School and Dunman High School. In the United States, attending Berkley School of Music, She took on the English name "Curley".. 
She started learning piano as a child and has passed ABRSM Grade 8 piano. In 2012, she finished as a finalist in the songwriting competition Eco Music Challenge with her song This Is Our Paradise. She also wrote a few songs and released them on her SoundCloud when she was in middle and high school .

Career

2016-2019: Sing! China and college life

Curley Gao auditioned for Sing! China season 1 in 2016 but did not make it through the blind audition. She auditioned again for Sing! China season 2 in 2017 and eventually finished as runner-up of the team mentored by Na Ying.

After the show, she signed with 梦响强音. On December 18, 2017, she released her first song 惹哭自己 which was included in 梦想在望, the compilation album of fellow Sing! China contestants. She released several singles with 梦响强音 later, including 颗粒季, the first single written by herself.

In January 2019, she moved to Boston and began her study in Berklee College of Music. While in college, she collaborated with different producers and released several songs independently.

2020-2022: Produce Camp 2020, BonBon Girls 303

In early 2020, Curley Gao returned to China and appeared on Tencent's  girl group survival show Produce Camp 2020. On July 4, She finished in first place and debuted as the center of BonBon Girls 303. Before the debut, her first EP 停不下来 was released when she was still on the show.

On August 11, 2020, it was announced that Curley Gao was elected as the team leader of BonBon Girls 303.

On August 12, her single 2030，我想对你说 (2030, I want to tell you) was released as the theme song of the United Nations 2020 International Youth Day Dialogue. She gave a speech titled 用克制生活换更好的未来 (Self-control for a better future) and performed the theme song live as one of the Chinese Youth Advocates for the United Nations Sustainable Development Goals at the event. On August 25, she released two special versions of the theme song for the 9th Fight Night of League of Legends, titled Fight of your life (English version) and 战斗的乐章 (Chinese version). She appeared on The Coming One: SUPER BAND on August 30 and collaborated with the band 水果星球 on an original song Stay With Me.

On September 26, she performed as a guest of Xiaoshenyang in the finale of Crossover Singer season 5. From October to December, she teamed up with Joey Yung in Dragon Television's singing competition show Our Song season 2, and the duo stayed for 6 episodes.

On December 16, the original soundtrack of TV drama Legend of Fei, which includes a song 红尘莫欺我年少 performed by Curley Gao, was released. Which later on January 19 2021, Curley Gao won The Most Popular Film and TV OST Female Singer with 红尘莫欺我年少 on QQ Music Film and TV OST Popularity Awards 2020.

In January 2021, Curley Gao appeared on Tencent Video's variety show 令人心动的offer and Hunan Television's Happy Camp as a guest. In September 2021, Curley Gao participated on Masked Dancing King as "Naughty Boss (顽皮老板)". She proceeded to go to the final and won The Most Promising awards.

On January 4, 2022 Kappa China Official announced that Curley along with INTO1's Mika will be their Youth Ambassador. In March 2022, Curley joined The Treasured Voice 3rd Season as a participant.

Curley Gao is also Coach Watch Brand Spokesperson.

On July 4, 2022 BonBon Girls 303 has officially disbanded due to their contract. Curley wrote their final song as a bonus.

2022 - Present: Solo Career

On midnight July 5, 2022, Curley Gao Studio announced her first EP 《吾》will be released on July 12.

On July 18, 2022, Curley Gao appointed as Maybelline New York Brand Ambassador.

Discography

Extended Plays

Singles

 希林娜依·高 refers to Curley G

Collaborations

 Curley or 希林娜依·高 refers to Curley G

Soundtrack Appearances

Promotional Songs

Songs from Produce Camp 2020

Sing! China single collections

Other original songs

Filmography

Variety and Reality Shows

Awards and nominations

Notes

References

External links
 Curley G on Spotify
 Curley G on QQ Music 
 Curley G on NetEase Music 
 Curley G on YouTube
 
 
 

1998 births
Living people
Chinese Mandopop singers
Singers from Xinjiang
BonBon Girls 303 members
21st-century Chinese women singers
Berklee College of Music alumni
Produce 101 (Chinese TV series) contestants
Chinese people of Uyghur descent
Reality show winners